Stanislav Tihomirov Shopov (born 23 February 2002) is a Bulgarian professional footballer who plays as a midfielder for CSKA Sofia.

Career 
Shopov began his youth career at Botev Plovdiv, at age seven. On 10 May 2018, Shopov signed his first professional contract with the club. He made his first-team debut on 15 May 2018 in a 2–0 win over Vereya Stara Zagora, coming on as a substitute in the latter minutes of the game.

On 6 October 2020, Shopov signed a two-year contract with the option of another season with Dutch Eredivisie club SC Heerenveen.

In June 2022, Shopov joined CSKA Sofia.

Career statistics

References

External links

Profile at the PFK Botev Plovdiv website

Living people
2002 births
Bulgarian footballers
Bulgarian expatriate footballers
Bulgaria youth international footballers
Bulgaria under-21 international footballers
Association football midfielders
Botev Plovdiv players
SC Heerenveen players
PFC CSKA Sofia players
First Professional Football League (Bulgaria) players
Eredivisie players
Expatriate footballers in the Netherlands
Bulgarian expatriate sportspeople in the Netherlands